Zenobia pulverulenta, the honeycup, is a North American species of shrubs, in the genus Zenobia, in the family Ericaceae. It is native to coastal plain of the Southeastern United States, in North Carolina, South Carolina, and Virginia.

Description
Zenobia pulverulenta is a deciduous or semi-evergreen shrub growing to 0.5-1.8 m tall.

The fruit is a dry five-valved capsule.

References

External links

United States Department of Agriculture Plants Profile: Zenobia pulverulenta
North Carolina Cooperative Extension 

Vaccinioideae
Flora of the Southeastern United States
Plants described in 1799
Flora without expected TNC conservation status